Camille Awards - European Film Composer Awards, are Brussels-based television awards created in 2014, named in tribute to Camille Saint-Saëns, composer of the first music to be scored for the movie The Assassination of the Duke of Guise (1908), as a celebration of European film music and its composers.

Editions

2016
The 2016 edition took place in Berlin, Germany on 10 February 2016.
Best Orchestral Score
 Bruno Coulais (France) for Le chant de la Mer (Song of the Sea)
 Pascal Gaigne (Spain) for Loreak (Flowers)
 Gary Yershonv (United Kingdom) for Mr Turner

Best Electro-Acoustic Score
 Timo Hietala (Finland) for Aikuisten Poika (Boy Upside Down)
 Trond Bjerknes (Norway) for Operasjon Arktis (Operation Arctic)
 Jonas Struck (Denmark) for Idealisten (The Idealist)

2017
The 2017 edition took place in Berlin, Germany on 2 February 2017.

Winners
Best Orchestral Score – Gaute Storaas for En Man Som Heter Ove (A Man Called Ove)
Best Orchestral Score – Clint Mansell for High Rise
Best Electro-Acoustic Score – Sophia Ersson for Pojkarna (Girls Lost)
Best Original Music for a Series – Victor Reyes for The Night Manager

2018
The 2018 edition took place in Pula, Croatia on 19–21 October 2018.

Best Orchestral Score
 Ginge Anvik (Norway) for Askeladden: I Dovregubbens hall
 Lasse Enersen (Finland) for The Unknown Soldier
 Dario Marianelli (United Kingdom) for Paddington 2
 
Best Electro-acoustic Score
 Ola Fløttum (Norway) for Thelma
 Adrian Foulkes & Lucio Godoy (Spain) for La niebla y la doncella
 Jonas Struck (Denmark) for QEDA

Best Original Music for a Series
 Lorne Balfe & Rupert Gregson-Williams (United Kingdom) for The Crown second season
 Jacob Groth (Denmark) for Modus second season
 Ivan Martinez Lacámara & Manel Santisteban (Spain) for La casa de papel

2020
2019 edition not was disputed, 2020 took place in Brussels, Belgium on 3 February 2020.
Lifetime Achievement: Ennio Morricone

See also
Camille Saint-Saëns

References

External links
  

Belgian film awards
Awards established in 2014